Bwejuu is a village on the Tanzanian island of Unguja, part of Zanzibar. It is located in the southeast of the island, on the east coast immediately south of the Michamvi Peninsula and the open, beach-rich district known as Dongwe. The larger town of Jambiani lies seven kilometres to the south.

References
Finke, J. (2006) The Rough Guide to Zanzibar (2nd edition). New York: Rough Guides.

Villages in Zanzibar